Gusheh-ye Sofla or Gusheh-ye Pain, both meaning "Lower Gusheh", may refer to:
 Gusheh-ye Sofla, Kohgiluyeh and Boyer-Ahmad
 Gusheh-ye Sofla, Markazi
 Gusheh-ye Sofla, South Khorasan